USS Cape May may refer to:

 , a United States Navy cargo ship and troop transport in commission from 1918 to 1919
 , a United States Navy tank landing ship in commission from 1944 to 1945, then reactivated for non-commissioned service before being finally deactivated in 1955

United States Navy ship names